The Archipelbuurt (literally Archipelago Neighbourhood) is a neighbourhood in the Centrum district of The Hague, Netherlands. Built primarily between 1860 and 1890, the neighbourhood is known for its Neo-Renaissance architecture and wide avenues and streets. Important streets in the Archipelbuurt include the Javastraat, the Surinamestraat, the Scheveningseweg, the Nassauplein and the Burgemeester De Monchyplein. A Jewish graveyard, a chapel and a former city hall of The Hague can be found in the neighbourhood. The Dutch novelist and poet Louis Couperus resided in Javastraat 17. Today, this is the Louis Couperus Museum.

References

External links
 Official website

Neighbourhoods of The Hague